The Bohemian Alps are a region in southeastern Nebraska about  north of Lincoln, Nebraska, or  west of Omaha, Nebraska. The name of the gentle rolling hills came from the Czech immigrants who migrated to Nebraska. This land reminded them of their homeland and the Czech influence is still in this region.

Settlements 

Abie
Bruno
Brainard
Dwight
Garland
Linwood
Loma
Malmo
Morse Bluff
Prague
Touhy
Valparaiso
Weston

References

Czech communities in the United States
Czech-American culture in Nebraska
Regions of Nebraska
Landforms of Butler County, Nebraska
Hills of Nebraska
Landforms of Saunders County, Nebraska